Jarrad Schofield (born 30 January 1975) is an Australian rules footballer who played for the West Coast Eagles, Port Adelaide and Fremantle in the Australian Football League (AFL) and Subiaco in the West Australian Football League (WAFL).

AFL career

West Coast career
Schofield was drafted with the 49th selection in the 1992 AFL draft by the West Coast Eagles.  He made his debut in 1993, but only played seven games in three seasons, until 1996, when he played 22 games and won an AFL Rising Star nomination, that he became an important player at the club. He was traded to Port Adelaide at the end of the 1998 season for Scott Cummings.

Port Adelaide career
He was traded to Port Adelaide in the 1998 trade period in return for Scott Cummings. He was noted for being a useful running outside midfielder, used as a "link man" in the midfield. In Round 5, 2002, he won the Showdown Medal. In 2004, Schofield enjoyed an outstanding season where he amassed a high amount of disposals for Port, and topped it off by being a part of Port's premiership side.

Fremantle career
In 2005 Schofield went back home to Perth, this time playing with the Fremantle Football Club. In 2005 he struggled to get on the field with numerous injuries and had what was considered a disappointing season which was much different from the heights he reached in 2004. 

Schofield struggled to break into the Fremantle side in 2006, playing only two games for the season.  He announced prior to Round 22 that he would retire from AFL football at the end of the 2006 season.

WAFL career

Subiaco career
Schofield made his debut for Subiaco in the West Australian Football League (WAFL) in 1993 and played over 100 games for them until his retirement in 2008. He was a member of their three WAFL Grand Final winning sides, in 2006, 2007 and 2008.

Coaching career
At the end of the 2008 season he retired from the WAFL and was appointed coach of the Subiaco colts side.  In 2012 he joined Claremont as an assistant coach, before being named as the senior coach of Subiaco for the 2013 season.

After a tough 2013 season where Subiaco could only manage an 8th placed finish in the competition, Schofield led the Lions to a dramatic turnaround with a second placed finish on the ladder in 2014, & despite a loss to East Perth in the first final, would turn the tables on them in the Grand Final where they won by 16 points, their first Premiership since 2008. Schofield would then lead Subiaco to the Minor Premiership in 2015 & would win that seasons Grand Final convincingly over West Perth. Two further Minor Premierships were ensured in seasons 2016 & 2017, however would end up losing to Peel Thunder in both Grand Finals-with Peel boasting a significant number of Fremantle Dockers players. 

The year 2018 would see Schofield and Subiaco make huge amends for the 2016 and 2017 disappointments, which drove them to an undefeated 2018 season and a huge Premiership victory over West Perth. As a result, Schofield would end up resigning from the Senior Coaching position, joining his former club Port Adelaide as an Assistant Coach for the 2019 season, reuniting with former Premiership teammates in Brett Montgomery & Dean Brogan.

Playing statistics

|- style="background-color: #EAEAEA"
!scope="row" style="text-align:center"|1993
|style="text-align:center;"|
|46||1||0||3||4||1||5||1||1||0.0||3.0||4.0||1.0||5.0||1.0||1.0
|-
!scope="row" style="text-align:center"|1994
|style="text-align:center;"|
|21||4||1||2||13||12||25||7||3||0.3||0.5||3.3||3.0||6.3||1.8||0.8
|- style="background:#eaeaea;"
!scope="row" style="text-align:center"|1995
|style="text-align:center;"|
|21||2||1||0||5||10||15||1||4||0.5||0.0||2.5||5.0||7.5||0.5||2.0
|-
!scope="row" style="text-align:center"|1996
|style="text-align:center;"|
|21||22||22||12||216||141||357||54||25||1.0||0.5||9.8||6.4||16.2||2.5||1.1
|- style="background:#eaeaea;"
!scope="row" style="text-align:center"|1997
|style="text-align:center;"|
|21||20||5||9||202||111||313||53||28||0.3||0.5||10.1||5.6||15.7||2.7||1.4
|-
!scope="row" style="text-align:center"|1998
|style="text-align:center;"|
|21||14||5||5||103||52||155||33||7|| 0.4||0.4||7.4||3.7||11.1||2.4||0.5
|- style="background:#eaeaea;"
!scope="row" style="text-align:center"|1999
|style="text-align:center;"|
|6||21||19||12||208||96||304||68||22||0.9||0.6||9.9||4.6||14.5||3.2||1.0
|-
! scope="row" style="text-align:center"|2000
|style="text-align:center;"|
|6||18||17||13||153||76||229||40||21||0.9||0.7||8.5||4.2||12.7||2.2||1.2
|- style="background:#eaeaea;"
!scope="row" style="text-align:center"|2001
|style="text-align:center;"|
|6||24||16||15||312||145||457||92||32||0.7||0.6||13.0||6.0||19.0||3.8||1.3
|-
!scope="row" style="text-align:center"|2002
|style="text-align:center;"|
|6||20||16||12||247||140||387||100||28||0.8||0.6||12.4||7.0||19.4||5.0||1.4
|- style="background:#eaeaea;"
!scope="row" style="text-align:center"|2003
|style="text-align:center;"|
|6||23||10||10||321||123||444||107||44||0.4||0.4||14.0||5.3||19.3||4.7||1.9
|-
!scope="row" style="text-align:center"|2004
|style="text-align:center;"|
|6||25||13||9||280||166||446||95||54||0.5||0.4||11.2||6.6||17.8||3.8||2.2
|- style="background:#eaeaea;"
!scope="row" style="text-align:center"|2005
|style="text-align:center;"|
|17||10||2||1||88||43||131||33||13||0.2||0.1||8.8||4.3||13.1||3.3||1.3
|-
!scope="row" style="text-align:center"|2006
|style="text-align:center;"|
|17||2||0||1||17||12||29||8||5||0.0||0.5||8.5||6.0||14.5||4.0||2.5
|- class="sortbottom"
!colspan=3|Career
!206
!127
!104
!2169
!1128
!3297
!692
!287
!0.6
!0.5
!10.5
!5.5
!16.0
!3.4
!1.4
|}

References

External links

Jarrad Schofield player profile page at WAFL FootyFacts

1975 births
Living people
West Coast Eagles players
Port Adelaide Football Club players
Port Adelaide Football Club Premiership players
Port Adelaide Football Club players (all competitions)
Fremantle Football Club players
Subiaco Football Club players
Subiaco Football Club coaches
People educated at Wesley College, Perth
Australian rules footballers from Western Australia
Western Australian State of Origin players
One-time VFL/AFL Premiership players